Calvin Ainsley Dean (born 21 May 1985) is an English actor, best known for portraying Darren Mullet in the 2009 film Tormented and for his appearance in Doctor Who.

Background
Dean was born in Truro, Cornwall. He grew up in Polruan, Cornwall, attending Polruan Primary School and later Fowey Community College. His mother, Lorraine, worked as a teaching assistant and nanny, and his father, Graham, worked for a local harbour commissioner and was a lighthouse keeper. He heard about the National Youth Theatre while in secondary school. After successfully auditioning, he stayed with the company from 2001 to 2005. During this time, he appeared in productions including The Threepenny Opera, Murder in the Cathedral, and Hanging Around at the National Theatre. From 2004 to 2007, he trained at the Mountview Academy of Theatre Arts in London, graduating with a BA (Hons) in Acting.

Career

Dean made his professional debut in The Duchess (2008), opposite Keira Knightley. He played Darren Mullet, his first lead role, in the comedy-horror film Tormented (2009). Dean received critical acclaim for his performance in Tormented. Sky Movies said, "Best of the bunch is Dean as the put-upon Darren Mullet, imbuing his tragic monster with a touch of Boris Karloff pathos in the online clips of his living torment, and coming across quite menacing when returning to slice up his victims."

Dean's television credits include the Neil Gaiman penned Cyberman episode of "Doctor Who" alongside Warwick Davis, Tamzin Outhwaite & Jason Watkins. This was the first time Dean & Matt Smith (actor) had worked together since being members of The National Youth Theatre together in 2003. Dean's other credits include Demons, Casualty, The Sarah Jane Adventures, Law & Order: UK and the BBC drama 'Dancing on the Edge' written and directed by Stephen Poliakoff.

Dean starred in Kneehigh Theatre’s Fup in 2016, Simon Harvey’s adaption of a novel by Jim Dodge, it received a 4 star rating from The Times and was performed at the Lost Gardens of Heligan in Cornwall in 2016. Dean will return to Kneehigh in 2018 for a UK tour of FUP.

Dean won Best Actor at the Eindhoven Film Festival, Brussels Short Film Festival and Hyperwave Film Awards, Los Angeles for his work in the short film Make Aliens Dance.

Dean appears in the Russell T. Davies Channel 4 drama It's A Sin (TV series) and plays Young Ted in the BBC drama Strike (TV series).

Dean identifies as gay.

Filmography

Awards and nominations

References

External links

 

1985 births
Alumni of the Mountview Academy of Theatre Arts
English male film actors
English male stage actors
National Youth Theatre members
English male television actors
Living people
People from Truro